PP-17 Rawalpindi-XI is a Constituency of Provincial Assembly of Punjab.

2008—2013: PP-12 (Rawalpindi-XII)

2013—2018: PP-12 (Rawalpindi-XII)
General elections were held on 11 May 2013. Ijaz Khan won this seat with 35836 votes.

All candidates receiving over 1,000 votes are listed here.

2018—2023 PP-17 (Rawalpindi-XII)
From 2018 PP-11 (Rawalpindi-XII) Become PP-17 (Rawalpindi-XII) With Some changes has follow (a) The following Census Charges of Rawalpindi City (1) Charge No.18 (2) Charge No.19 (3) Charge No.20 (4) Charge No.21 Circle No. 1 and 2 (5) Charge No.27 and (6) Charge No.28 of Rawalpindi District.

General elections are scheduled to be held on 25 July 2018.

See also
 PP-16 Rawalpindi-X
 PP-18 Rawalpindi-XII

References

External links
 Election commission Pakistan's official website
 Awazoday.com check result
 Official Website of Government of Punjab

R